The Oregon Pony was the first steam locomotive to be built on the Pacific Coast and the first to be used in the Oregon Territory.  The locomotive, a geared steam 5' gauge locomotive with 9"X18" cylinders and 34" drivers, was used in the early 1860s to portage steamboat passengers and goods past the Cascades Rapids, a dangerous stretch of the Columbia River now drowned by the Bonneville Dam. Steamboats provided transportation on the Columbia  between Portland, Oregon and mining areas in Idaho and the Columbia Plateau. Portage was also necessary at other navigation obstructions, including Celilo Falls.

San Francisco's Vulcan Iron Works built the wood-burning engine in 1861 for $4,000. Weighing only 8 tons and only 14.5 feet long, the Oregon Pony arrived in Oregon in 1862 and made her initial run on May 10, 1862 with engineer Theodore A. Goffe at the throttle. It replaced flat cars running on rails, equipped with benches for passengers and pulled by mules for 4.5 miles over iron-reinforced wooden rails for the Oregon Portage Railway. Shortly after the Oregon Pony was put into service, canopies were added to protect the passengers and their goods from the hot, sooty water that rained down on everything as the locomotive operates. The engine moved nearly 200 tons a day between the Cascades and Bonneville.

The railway was bought by Oregon Steam Navigation Company (OSN). The company consolidated its Cascades rail portage monopoly on the Washington side of the Columbia River and moved the Oregon Pony to The Dalles, where it may have been used for portages around Celilo Falls.

In 1866, OSN sold the locomotive and it was returned to San Francisco for work filling and grading the streets of that city. After the Oregon Pony was damaged in a 1904 fire, the owner partially restored it and donated it to the Oregon Historical Society in Portland, Oregon. It was displayed at the 1905 Lewis and Clark Exposition and afterward at the Albina Railyard. In the 1930s, the Oregon Pony was moved to Union Station; it was returned to Cascade Locks in 1970. The Port of Cascade Locks funded a 1981 restoration and built a permanent, covered display.

The Oregon Pony is currently owned by the State of Oregon and is preserved in a climate controlled exhibition chamber next to the Cascade Locks Historical Museum at the Marine Park, Cascade Locks. In February 2016, Trains Magazine reported that the Union Pacific Railroad donated $10000 for a new shelter for the Oregon Pony.

References

Further reading
 
 
 

Oregon Territory
History of Washington (state)
Columbia River
Columbia River Gorge
Vulcan Iron Works locomotives
Preserved steam locomotives of Oregon